Oshane may refer to:

Places 

 Oshane, a village in northwestern Bulgaria
 Oshane Glacier, a glacier in Antarctica named after the above

People

Given name 
 Oshane Bailey (born 1989), Jamaican sprinter
 Oshane Thomas (born 1997), Jamaican cricketer
 Oshane Ximines (born 1996), American football outside linebacker

Surname 
 O'Shane, people with the surname